Graziano Delrio (born 27 April 1960) is an Italian medical doctor and politician, who served in the government of Italy as Minister of Infrastructure and Transport from 2 April 2015 to 1 June 2018. He previously served as the state secretary to Prime Minister Matteo Renzi. He was minister for regional affairs and autonomy from 28 April 2013 to 22 February 2014 as part of the Letta Cabinet. He also served as the mayor of Reggio Emilia.

Personal life
Graziano Delrio was born in Reggio nell'Emilia on 27 April 1960, he is married and has nine children. He holds a degree in medicine and studied in the UK and Israel. His specialization is in endocrinology.

He is close to the Communion and Liberation movement, and he spoke in the Rimini Meeting in August 2018.

Career
Delrio worked at the University of Modena and Reggio Emilia as a faculty member and researcher. He is the founder and former director of the Giorgio la Pira Association, which was founded to promote cultural contact between Italy and the Middle East. He is a senior member of the Democratic Party. In 1999, he became a member of the municipal council of the Reggio Emilia province. In 2000, he was elected to the regional board and served as the president of the health and social politics commission for the province and as the member of the environment and territory commission.

In 2004, he became a member of the Margherita Party and was elected as the mayor of Reggio Emilia for the Unione Party. He was the president of national association of Italian municipalities until July 2013 when the mayor of Turin, Piero Fassino, was elected to the post. On 28 April 2013, Delrio was appointed minister for regional affairs and autonomy to the cabinet led by the Prime Minister Enrico Letta. On 22 February 2014, he was appointed state secretary to the Prime Minister Matteo Renzi's office.

In 2014, the Italian Parliament approved a law proposed by Del Rio, which abolished the Provinces of Italy, ascribing their political and administrative powers to the upper and lower constituent entities of the national jurisdiction (in Italian called comune and regione).
As of March 2021, the related reform was implemented by Friuli Venezia Giulia and Sicily.

Legal issues
Delrio was investigated due 'ndrangheta illegal goods and services control in the 2010s.

References

External links

21st-century Italian politicians
1960 births
Democratic Party (Italy) politicians
Government ministers of Italy
Italian endocrinologists
Italian Roman Catholics
Academic staff of the University of Modena and Reggio Emilia
Letta Cabinet
Living people
Mayors of Reggio Emilia
Renzi Cabinet
Transport ministers of Italy
Communion and Liberation